Hibbertia ligulata is a species of flowering plant in the family Dilleniaceae and is endemic to the Northern Territory. It is a shrublet with hairy, wiry branches, linear leaves, and single yellow flowers arranged in leaf axils with twelve stamens arranged in bundles around the two carpels.

Description

Taxonomy
Hibbertia ligulata was first formally described in 2010 by Hellmut R. Toelken in the Journal of the Adelaide Botanic Gardens from specimens collected on Munmarlary Station in 1973. The specific epithet (ligulata) means "strap-shaped", referring to the shape of the bracts.

Distribution and habitat
This hibbertia grows in forest at the base of the Arnhem Land Plateau.

Conservation status
Hibbertia incurvata is classified as "data deficient" under the Territory Parks and Wildlife Conservation Act 1976.

See also
List of Hibbertia species

References

ligulata
Flora of the Northern Territory
Plants described in 2010
Taxa named by Hellmut R. Toelken